The Los Angeles Film School (informally LA Film School) is a for-profit college in Los Angeles, California offering associate and bachelor's degrees in majors relating to the entertainment industry. The school encompasses the Los Angeles Recording School and is accredited by the Accrediting Commission of Career Schools and Colleges and the California Bureau for Private Postsecondary Education.

History

The Los Angeles Film School was founded in 1999. The school was conceived and founded by married investors Paul Kessler, a financier, and Diana Derycz-Kessler, a Harvard-trained lawyer and entrepreneur, together with Thom Mount, and venture capitalist Bud MaLette. In 1998, the founders developed the idea for the school and made an initial investment of $2 million.

The first classes began in September 1999, and the school's first students graduated in July 2000. The founding faculty included Tom Schatz, professor of film, William A. Fraker and Janusz Kamiński teaching cinematography, Jon Amiel and Donald Petrie teaching directing, Dede Allen teaching editing, Ron Judkins teaching sound production, and Joe Byron, Director of Technology.

The school was originally funded by Kessler and Derycz-Kessler through their company Bristol Investments. After 18 months, the couple bought out their partners in the school and Dercyz-Kessler became the CEO, seeking to address overspending in a more active role. The total investment in the school had grown to $15 million by 2001, including the installation of the professional equipment required for film production. , students at the school had created 700 short films. The total number of students was 150 full-time and approximately 30 part-time.

In 2003, the school formed a partnership with several private equity investors.  In April 2011, a decision was made by ACCET to withdraw its accreditation of The Los Angeles Recording School. The decision was stayed on appeal, and the school was permitted to resign its accreditation amicably, following the transfer of remaining students to The Los Angeles Film School, which is accredited by the ACCSC.

In February 2010, employees of The Los Angeles Film School submitted authorization cards to the National Labor Relations Board in an effort to become unionized as part of the California Federation of Teachers. Following the controversial firing of a Los Angeles Film School employee and union organizer, and the litigation which led to her reinstatement, the group withdrew its petition for unionization. In July 2011, the school settled a dispute with a local farmers market, which regularly blocked access to a Los Angeles Film School parking garage.

By 2011, the school's enrollment had grown to 1,800 students.  Derycz-Kessler had a 17-year tenure as CEO (from 2000 to July 2017).  Tammy Elliott is currently the school's President.

Facilities

The Los Angeles Film School is located on Sunset Boulevard, where its quarter-million square foot campus includes the historic RCA Building, which is known for being a recording place of artists including Elvis Presley, the Rolling Stones and Henry Mancini. In 2001, the school opened a 345-seat, THX-certified theater featuring a Sony 4K projector. The campus also includes a  sound stage and the  Ivar Theater. The school's main stage houses a  set of a Victorian house, where students can produce television shows with industry professionals. Overall, $61 million had been invested in the buildings alone.

Academics
The school is accredited by the Accrediting Commission of Career Schools and Colleges (ACCSC) and the California Bureau for Private Postsecondary Education (BPPE) to offer associate and bachelor's degrees. In order to maintain its accreditation with the ACCSC, the school must achieve 70% industry job placement for its students within a year of graduation. The school is an Avid Pro Tools curriculum partner.

The school is approved to teach veterans by the California State Approving Agency for Veterans Education. It is also a member of the Servicemembers Opportunity College Consortium, and is considered a military friendly school by MilitaryFriendly.com. Military Times magazine ranked The Los Angeles Film School 7th on their "Best for Vets: Career & Technical Colleges" list for 2014, and in the top five on 2015's list.

Degree programs
The Los Angeles Film School offers several associate and bachelor's degree programs related to the entertainment industry. Film related degrees include an associate degree in film, and bachelor's degrees in digital filmmaking and film production. Degrees related to the video game industry include an associate degree in game production and a bachelor's in game production and design.  The school also offers an associate degree in computer animation and a bachelor's in animation and visual effects. Two associate degrees related to the music industry are offered, one in music production and one in recording arts. In addition, the school offers a bachelor's degree in entertainment business.

Noteworthy faculty and staff
Since 2012, former Universal Studios executive and film producer Hal Lieberman has headed a bachelor of science program in entertainment business.

Joe Byron, who holds eight patents related to motion picture production, has served several roles at the school since 1999, including Director of Education, Director of Technology, and Director of Student and Alumni Engagement.

Noteworthy productions and events

The feature-length film Demon Slayer was produced by the school in 2003 and was financed by Roger Corman. The cast and crew for the film, including director James Cotton, was composed of students and alumni of The Los Angeles Film School. The film was produced through the school's 1st Chance Films program, which partners well-known producers with its students to make films using the facilities at the school. The school's Military Services Department produced the 2011 documentary The Yellow Ribbon Experience, which chronicles the reintegration of soldiers from the 63rd Regional Support Command into civilian life.  
 
Since 2007, the school has held an annual panel discussion which features the writers of Oscar-nominated films. In 2010, the Grammy Lifetime Achievement Award for Bob Marley was presented to the artist's family at the school. Since 2009, the school has held an annual Veterans Day event called the "Annual Salute" to honor students with military service records.

, The Los Angeles Film School has hosted the Evolution International Film Festival. The school also served as host to the 2012 GI Film Festival as part of its Annual Salute, and featured two films produced by Los Angeles Film School students.

The school was host to the 2013 Los Angeles Brazilian Film Festival and also hosts the Los Angeles-based 3D Film Festival. The school has also hosted the BAFTA Student Film Awards in 2011.

Noteworthy alumni
Several alumni of The Los Angeles Film School have gone on to have notable careers in the entertainment industry, including David Eischen, of techno band Transoverload, Kyle Newacheck, director and co-creator of the television series Workaholics; Ari Levine, who is a member of the writing and producing team for musician Bruno Mars; Martin Pensa, who was nominated for an Oscar for his work editing the film Dallas Buyers Club; Brandon Trost, who has served as cinematographer on several films including That Awkward Moment and This is the End; Jaycen Joshua, who is a Grammy Award-winning sound mixer; and Brian Taylor, co-writer and co-director of Crank, Crank: High Voltage and Gamer. In 2021 Phillip Bladh became the first alumni to win an Academy Award for best sound for the movie Sound of Metal.

Lawsuit 
The Los Angeles Film School and Los Angeles Recording School faced a class action lawsuit in 2010, due to the school allegedly using deceptive tactics in promising students jobs in the entertainment industry.  The complaint stated that the school allegedly failed to give them their 900 hours of instruction, and would allegedly attempt to bribe students with gift cards to Target and Best Buy if they would sign self-employment forms misrepresenting sales clerk positions at the Apple Store and Guitar Center as "Creative positions".

See also
 List of film schools in the United States
 Los Angeles Recording School
 For Profit Schools
 Career Education Corp

References

External links

Film schools in California
Schools in Los Angeles
For-profit universities and colleges in the United States
Vocational education in the United States
Educational institutions established in 1999
1999 establishments in California
Buildings and structures in Hollywood, Los Angeles